Illinois Route 57 is a north–south state highway in western Illinois.

Route description 
Illinois 57 runs from Fall Creek northwest to Quincy. It is known as the Gardner Expressway in and near Quincy.

History 
SBI Route 57 was the current U.S. Route 41 and Illinois Route 50 from Highland Park to Chicago. In 1949 it was moved to Hull to Quincy. In 1999 it was shortened to its current length after Interstate 172 was completed.

Major intersections

References

External links

057
U.S. Route 41
Transportation in Adams County, Illinois